The Cultural Institutions Group (CIG) is a coalition of institutions providing cultural and educational resources to the public in New York City that are subsidized by the city. The group originated in the last quarter of the 19th century with planning efforts by New York City to cope with becoming a major city. The organizations joined together in the mid-20th century to discuss and improve working conditions in New York City. Today, the CIG includes 34 cultural institutions.

History
The basic framework for the public-private partnerships between New York City and its 34 cultural institutions was established in the 19th century. The original concept of the partnerships has succeeded beyond its founders' most ambitious expectations.

1877-1945: The original partnerships
In the last quarter of the 19th century, the City of New York began a comprehensive planning effort to cope with its rapid growth and to establish itself as a major world city. The State of New York passed legislation that incorporated the institutions and authorized the city to build facilities and lease them and the city-owned parkland on which they sat to the new private institutions. The partnership stipulated that the city would provide these institutions with land, facilities and funds for maintenance and security. The private institutions in turn would develop specialized cultural services and collections which would be available to the general public. The model married the traditions of European subsidy for the arts with American independence and capitalism. The pattern was established with the American Museum of Natural History in 1877, followed by The Metropolitan Museum of Art, 1878; New York Botanical Garden, 1891; Bronx Zoo, 1895; Brooklyn Museum, 1897; Brooklyn Children's Museum, 1899. After the turn of the 20th century, four additional organizations negotiated agreements with the city: Staten Island Institute of Arts and Sciences, 1908; Brooklyn Botanic Garden, 1909; Museum of the City of New York, 1922; Staten Island Zoological Society, 1936.

1945-1976: Conflict and policy
From 1952 to 1967, an additional five organizations would begin to receive regular city support: Brooklyn Academy of Music, 1952; Queens Botanical Garden, 1962; New York Hall of Science, 1965; Wave Hill, 1965; Staten Island Historical Society, 1967. In the 1950s the City and the cultural organizations engaged in protracted discussions over the issue of wages and working conditions of employees who were City reimbursed. Following a strike action against eight of the institutions in 1958 and 1959, the institutions met in 1960 in an informal organization which came to be known as the Cultural Institutions Group or CIG. The labor settlement that was eventually reached was an unconventional one that involved "tri-partite" bargaining and obligated the institutions and the City of New York to negotiate (and the city to pay for) wage and benefit increases, while working conditions were negotiated between the union and the individual organizations.

Having recognized a valuable community of interests, the CIG continued to meet to address other issues. In 1962, Mayor Robert F. Wagner, Jr. established a mayoral Office of Cultural Affairs (OCA) that pre-dated the National Endowment for the Arts. In 1967, Mayor John V. Lindsay moved the OCA functions into the newly titled Department of Parks and Recreation and Cultural Affairs (PRCA). Program grants expanded considerably, and a number of newer organizations began to make the case for city operating support including Bronx County Historical Society, Bronx Museum of the Arts, El Museo del Barrio, Jamaica Center for Arts & Learning, Queens Theatre in the Park, Queens Museum of Art, Staten Island Children's Museum, and the Studio Museum in Harlem. In 1974, Mayor Abraham D. Beame appointed the Committee on Cultural Policy, which recommended removing cultural affairs from PRCA and that the city concentrate its funding in the areas of facilities and basic support.

1976-1990: Cultural affairs
Enabling legislation for a City Department of Cultural Affairs (DCA) was passed in 1975, and the new department began to operate in 1976. In 1978, Mayor Edward I. Koch took office as the city began to climb out of its fiscal crisis. He agreed that the seven newer organizations and the New York State Theater should receive regular city support for operating expenses. And seven cultural organizations would also begin to receive this category of support including Snug Harbor Cultural Center, 1981; Museum of the Moving Image, 1982; MoMA PS1, 1982; The New York Public Theater, 1982; New York City Center, 1981; Staten Island Botanical Garden, 1983; and Carnegie Hall, 1986.

1990-Present: Government transitions and the budget
By the 1990s, two new organizations had joined the ranks of the CIG: Flushing Town Hall and the Museum of Jewish Heritage. With a new city charter redistributing budgeting powers from the Board of Estimate to the Mayor and a larger City Council and the implementation of term limits in 2001, the tentative pas de deux of the 1980s budget negotiations became a full-fledged ballet in the 1990s. Between 1980 and 2007, there were only two years when the proposed Executive Budget and the Adopted Budget for the Department of Cultural Affairs were the same.

Mayor Michael R. Bloomberg and City Council Speaker Christine C. Quinn jointly announced a preliminary budget for 2008 that established a new base level of funding for cultural organizations. In addition, the administration brought new reforms to the city’s approach to cultural funding. The agency increased its competitive Cultural Development Fund nearly tenfold to $30 million to support non-CIG organizations.

Member organizations

American Museum of Natural History
The Bronx County Historical Society
The Bronx Museum of the Arts
Brooklyn Academy of Music
Brooklyn Botanic Garden
Brooklyn Children's Museum
Brooklyn Museum
Carnegie Hall
Flushing Town Hall
Lincoln Center for the Performing Arts
Jamaica Center for Arts & Learning
The Metropolitan Museum of Art
El Museo del Barrio
Museum of Jewish Heritage
Museum of the City of New York
Museum of the Moving Image
The New York Botanical Garden
New York City Center
New York Hall of Science
The New York Public Theater
New York State Theater:
New York City Ballet
New York City Opera
MoMA PS1 Contemporary Art Center
Queens Botanical Garden
Queens Museum of Art
Queens Theatre in the Park
Snug Harbor Cultural Center
Staten Island Botanical Garden
Staten Island Children's Museum
Staten Island Historical Society
Staten Island Museum
Staten Island Zoological Society
The Studio Museum in Harlem
Wave Hill
Weeksville Heritage Center
Wildlife Conservation Society:
Bronx Zoo
New York Aquarium

References

External links
 Official Website

Culture of New York City